The 3rd congressional district of South Carolina is a congressional district in western South Carolina bordering both Georgia and North Carolina.  It includes all of Abbeville, Anderson, Edgefield, Greenwood, Laurens, McCormick, Oconee, Pickens and Saluda counties and portions of Greenville and Newberry counties.  The district is mostly rural, but much of the economy revolves around the manufacturing centers of Anderson and Greenwood.

History 
Historically, the district was a Democratic stronghold, and Democrats continued to hold most local offices well into the 1990s.  However, most residents share the socially conservative views of their counterparts in the 4th district and the district has elected Republicans since 1994. Republicans now dominate the district's politics at all levels, usually scoring margins rivaling those in the 4th. Indeed, no Democrat has cleared the 40 percent mark in the district in almost a quarter-century.

South Carolina's senior Senator, Lindsey Graham, held this seat from 1995 to 2003. He was succeeded by J. Gresham Barrett, who gave up the seat in order to run for governor. State Rep. Jeff Duncan won the seat in 2010.

From 2003 to 2013, the district included all of Abbeville, Anderson, Edgefield, Greenwood, McCormick, Oconee, Pickens and Saluda counties and most of Aiken and Laurens counties.

Counties 
Counties in the 2023-2033 district map.
 Abbeville County
 Anderson County
 Edgefield County
 Greenville County (part)
 Greenwood County
 Laurens County
 McCormick County
 Newberry County
 Oconee County
 Pickens County
 Saluda County

Election results from presidential races

List of members representing the district

Recent election results

2012

2014

2016

2018

2020

2022

See also

South Carolina's congressional districts
List of United States congressional districts

References

 Congressional Biographical Directory of the United States 1774–present

03
Abbeville County
Aiken County
Anderson County
Edgefield County
Greenwood County
Laurens County
McCormick County
Oconee County
Pickens County
Saluda County